Iyunga is an administrative ward in the Mbeya Urban district of the Mbeya Region of Tanzania. In 2016 the Tanzania National Bureau of Statistics report there were 16,560 people in the ward, from 7,377 in 2012.

Neighborhoods 
The ward has 5 neighborhoods.
 Igale
 Ikuti
 Inyala
 Maendeleo
 Sisintila

References 

Wards of Mbeya Region